Valentina "Vali" Höll (born 11 December 2001) is an Austrian cyclist who competes in downhill mountain biking.

She became interested in the sport at a young age, as both of her parents rode bikes. At the age of 12, she signed a 6-year contract with YT Industries, that ended in 2020. Höll balanced competing and training with studying until graduating high school in 2020. She now rides at a professional level, competing in the elite category. She currently rides for the  Trek Factory Team. Her sponsors include Evoc, Red Bull, and SRAM.

Personal life 

Höll was born in Salzburg, Austria, and grew up in a ski lodge built by her grandparents. She began racing locally, competing against the boys. She currently lives in Saalbach, Austria.

Results

2018 
1st Place: UCI Mountain Bike Junior Downhill World Cup, in Lošinj, Croatia

1st Place: UCI Mountain Bike Junior Downhill World Cup, in Fort William, UK

1st Place: Crankworx Downhill – Juniors, in Innsbruck, Austria

3rd Place: Crankworx Pump Track, in Innsbruck, Austria

1st Place: UCI Mountain Bike Junior Downhill World Cup, in Val di Sole, Italy

1st Place: UCI Mountain Bike Junior Downhill World Cup, in Vallnord, Andorra

1st Place: UCI Mountain Bike Junior Downhill World Cup, in Mont-Sainte-Anne, Canada

1st Place: UCI Mountain Bike Junior Downhill World Cup, in La Bresse, France

1st Place overall: UCI Mountain Bike Junior Downhill World Cup

2019 
1st Place: UCI Mountain Bike Junior Downhill World Cup, in Maribor, Slovenia

2nd Place: UCI Mountain Bike Junior Downhill World Cup, in Fort William, UK

1st Place: UCI Mountain Bike Junior Downhill World Cup, in Leogang, Austria

1st Place: UCI Mountain Bike Junior Downhill World Cup, in Vallnord, Andorra

1st Place: UCI Mountain Bike Junior Downhill World Cup, in Les Gets, France

2nd Place: UCI Mountain Bike Junior Downhill World Cup, in Val di Sole, Italy

3rd Place: Crankworx Air DH, in Whistler, Canada

2nd Place: Canadian Open DH, in Whistler, Canada

1st Place: UCI Mountain Bike Junior Downhill World Cup, in Snowshoe, USA

1st Place: UCI MTB World Championships – Junior Women's Downhill, in Mont-Sainte-Anne, Canada

2020 
1st Place: Crankworx Downhill, in Innsbruck, Austria

2021 
1st Place: UCI Mountain Bike Elite Women's Downhill World Cup, in Snowshoe, USA

References

Austrian female cyclists
Downhill mountain bikers
2001 births
Living people
Austrian mountain bikers
Sportspeople from Salzburg
21st-century Austrian women